Quercus galeanensis is a species of oak tree in the family Fagaceae, native to Northeastern Mexico. The tree is endemic to Mexico, restricted to two subpopulations occupying a narrow band (150 x 10–20 km) from Galeana in Nuevo León state, to the Miquihuana region in Tamaulipas state. It is an IUCN Red List endangered species, threatened by habitat loss. It is placed in section Lobatae.

References

galeanensis
Endemic oaks of Mexico
Flora of Nuevo León
Flora of Tamaulipas
Taxonomy articles created by Polbot
Flora of the Sierra Madre Oriental